Fratkin is a surname. Notable people with this surname include:

 Kaleigh Fratkin (born 1992), Canadian ice hockey player
 Stuart Fratkin (born 1963), American actor